Utu is a Māori concept of reciprocation or balance.

To retain mana, both friendly and unfriendly actions require an appropriate response, hence utu covers both the reciprocation of kind deeds, and the seeking of revenge.

Utu is one of the key principles of the constitutional tradition of Māori along with whanaungatanga (the centrality of relationships), mana and tapu/noa (the recognition of the spiritual dimension).   

Utu can also be used in reference to monetary repayments, paying or repaying.

Cultural references
 Utu, a 1983 New Zealand film loosely based on events from Te Kooti's War
 "Amazon's "one-click" patent reconsidered" - a modern example of the term's use within New Zealand society

References

External links
 An exploration of utu as a legal concept

Māori words and phrases
Māori society